Bảo Ninh is a town and rural commune (xã) in Đồng Hới city, the capital of Quảng Bình Province, North Central Coast region of Vietnam. This commune is located on the right bank of Nhật Lệ River, by the South China Sea. 
As of 2009, this commune has a population of 8,906 inhabitants, an area of 13.64 square kilometers.
Some tourist facilities are under construction in this commune.

References

Communes of Quảng Bình province
Populated places in Quảng Bình province